The 1994 Coca-Cola 600, the 35th running of the event, was the 11th race of the 1994 NASCAR Winston Cup Series. It was won by Jeff Gordon, who started from the pole and earned his first victory in a points-paying race. Gordon won the race 3.3 seconds ahead of Rusty Wallace with Geoff Bodine and Dale Jarrett following behind.

There was some topic humor during the race as someone put up a sign alongside the track; this one stating "Attention All Drivers! Spinning thru the grass will result in caning." The sign was joking about 18-year-old American Michael P. Fay who infamously got caned in Singapore earlier in the year after being convicted of vandalizing cars, causing an international incident. Fay's case was big news at the time, he didn't return to the USA until the month after this race.

Background
Charlotte Motor Speedway is a motorsports complex located in Concord, North Carolina, 13 miles from Charlotte, North Carolina. The complex features a 1.5 miles (2.4 km) quad oval track that hosts NASCAR racing including the prestigious Coca-Cola 600 on Memorial Day weekend and The Winston, as well as the Mello Yello 500. The speedway was built in 1959 by Bruton Smith and is considered the home track for NASCAR with many race teams located in the Charlotte area. The track is owned and operated by Speedway Motorsports Inc. (SMI) with Marcus G. Smith (son of Bruton Smith) as track president.

Race report
Four drivers failed to qualify for this race: Jimmy Hensley, Dave Marcis, Bobby Hillin Jr. and Jim Sauter. Nearly 12% of this race would be held under a caution flag while the average green flag run was just over 35 laps. The big car wrecks during the race were a product of cars trying to get by Martin who was slow and trying to get to the inside to get to the pits. Earnhardt just happened to be the guy who was there at that time and unfortunately several good cars got tore up.

Loy Allen, Jr. was one of the most unsung wildcards who competed relatively well in the race despite qualifying in 37th place. While he managed to make some progress during the course of the race, he wasn't aggressive enough to finish in the top-10, despite having the consistency and performance to squeeze out a quality finish from his vehicle.

Steve Grissom crashed into the wall on a lap 174 restart. Kyle Petty tried to race back to the caution and nearly hit him. Grissom was unbuckling at the time. If Petty had hit Grissom, Grissom would almost certainly have been killed.

Roger Penske had a very good day. Earlier in the day Al Unser, Jr. won the Indy 500 for the Captain thanks in part to a secret weapon pushrod Mercedes engine. Here in Charlotte Rusty Wallace leads the most laps en route to a second-place finish, coming up just short of giving Penske a sweep. While Rusty had the car to beat, the first of Gordon getting the better of Rusty in the Coke 600 because of the miracles that are involved in making the final pit stop. At the time of his arrival, Jeff Gordon was the most acclaimed rookie of the 1990s decade; being compared to Richard Petty in the 1970s and Dale Earnhardt in the 1980s.

This was the day and the race that began a more modern era of NASCAR as Jeff Gordon wins for the first time in what is now the NASCAR Cup Series. After many solid runs from 1993 onward, it was only a matter of time when the boy wonder went to victory lane and it took place on this night by having one of the best cars, along with Mast, Geoff Bodine, Rudd, Irvan and Rusty. The event involved a lot of skilful driving with a long awaited first time winner unlike today's NASCAR while luck-based strategies play a large role in determining the winner of the race.

John Andretti's day started off well with a top 10 finish at Indy, but didn't end so well here. He still managed over 800 racing miles on the day. It was an exceptionally rare sight for Roses to have sponsored a Winston Cup car; especially around the point Roses getting hammered much like the other discount chains blindsided by the rapid expansion of Wal-Mart. Most people sat on the backstretch bleachers, they were wooden just like at the local parks. Most people were dirt poor during the mid-1990s due to the changing economy in the Southeastern United States and were glad to able to afford the race tickets.

Gordon's crew chief Ray Evernham made the call for two tires while Wallace's crew chief made the call for four. Evernham's call paid off and Gordon outlasted Wallace in the closing laps. Following this race, Gordon would be referred to by Dale Earnhardt as the "Wonder Boy". Gordon ended up crying in Victory Lane after his victory.

After many solid runs from 1993 onward, it was only a matter of time when the boy wonder went to victory lane and it took place on this night by having one of the best cars, along with Mast, Geoff Bodine, Rudd, Irvan and Rusty. Things would only get better for Jeff going forward: four-time Cup champion, three-time winner of the 600, three-time winner of The Daytona 500, one of the all time greats, and this race started it all.

Top 10 finishers

Standings after the race

References

Coca-Cola 600
Coca-Cola 600
NASCAR races at Charlotte Motor Speedway
Coca-Cola 600
1994 in motorsport